Renegar may refer to:

 Brian Renegar (born 1950), American politician
 James Renegar (born 1955), American mathematician
 Renegar Glacier, in Antarctica